E412 may refer to:
 Guar gum, a food additive
 FS class E412, a powerful electric locomotive in use in Italy